Newbold Quarry Park is a nature reserve in Newbold-on-Avon, around 1½ miles north-west of Rugby town centre, Warwickshire, England. It is managed by the Warwickshire Wildlife Trust on behalf of Rugby Borough Council.

History

The site was formerly used to quarry for Blue Lias limestone, in connection with the local cement industry. Quarrying at the site was initiated in 1877 by the Newbold Lime & Cement Co. Ltd, and several cement kilns operated alongside the quarry. Production ended in 1910, started again briefly in 1920, and was abandoned permanently by 1923 after the quarry flooded. The plant was dismantled in 1927.

The derelict quarry was the scene of a tragedy in October 1990 when two local boys aged ten and six drowned after falling into the water, following this, the site was taken over by Rugby Borough Council in 1991 and turned into a nature reserve with improved access, fencing and warning signs.

Wildlife

Newbold Quarry Park attracts many water birds, such as great crested grebes, swans, moorhens and a variety of ducks. The clean, limey water also support native crayfish, which resemble small lobsters. Other species have also been found living in the water including smooth newts, frog tadpoles, pike and perch fish species, and also invertebrates living in the soft quarry walls. Bat boxes have also been provided.  Other water mammals such as water rats can be seen swimming in the water.

Facilities

The disabled-user toilet is closed due to vandalism - there are no public facilities.

The car park on Egerton Close is provided for parking. Entry is free of charge.

There are viewing platforms along the blue lime-rich clay spoilbanks, and picnic sites.

A number of wild paths have been constructed around the site, some of which are accessible to wheelchairs and pushchairs.

Depth
Skilled Divers exploring it in 2018 discovered, among other dangerous hazards, the remains of two cars dating from the 1970s and 80s, a motorbike, vertical metal beams and an old pram frame.

The quarry is extremely deep and a public space protection order prohibits swimming due to safety concerns. Fishing is also restricted.

See also
 Swift Valley Nature Reserve - another nature reserve nearby

References

External links

 Newbold Quarry - Warwickshire Wildlife Trust

Nature reserves in Warwickshire
Warwickshire Wildlife Trust
Rugby, Warwickshire
1991 establishments in England